The Billboard Mainstream Rock chart is compiled from the number of airplay songs received from active rock and heritage rock radio stations in the United States. Below are the songs that have reached number one on the chart during the 2020s, listed in chronological order.

2020s

 – Number-one mainstream rock song of the year.

Notes

References

United States Mainstream Rock
Mainstream 2020s